Ernani do Amaral Peixoto Airport , is the airport serving Itaperuna, Brazil.

Airlines and destinations
No scheduled flights operate at this airport.

Access

See also

List of airports in Brazil

References

External links

Airports in Rio de Janeiro (state)